The year 1619 in science and technology involved some significant events.

Astronomy

 Publication of Johannes Kepler's third law of planetary motion in his Harmonices Mundi. He also recognises the duality of convex polyhedra.
 Publication of the Jesuit Giuseppe Biancani's Sphaera mundi, seu cosmographia demonstrativa, ac facili methodo tradita in Bologna.

Biochemistry
 Lactose is discovered by Fabriccio Bartoletti; the word lactose comes from the Latin word lac which means "milk".

Exploration
 In North America, the Churchill River is discovered by Danish explorer Jens Munk, and it will be used for over 100 years as a trading route of the Hudson's Bay Company from their fort at its mouth to the interior.
 Frederick de Houtman and Jans van Edel discover the Houtman Abrolhos islands.

Medicine
Dermod O'Meara's text on genetic disorders, De Moribus: Pathologia Haereditaria Generalis is published in Dublin, the first medical text published in Ireland.

Metallurgy
 Sir Basil Brooke produces steel using a reverbatory furnace in Coalbrookdale, England.

Births
 probable date – Daniel Whistler, English physician (died 1684)

Deaths
 May 21 – Hieronymus Fabricius, Italian anatomist and embryologist (born 1537)
 September – Hans Lippershey, Dutch lensmaker, credited with inventing the telescope in 1608 (born c. 1570)
 Olivier de Serres, French soil scientist (born 1539)
 Caterina Vitale, Maltese chemist (born 1566)

References

 
17th century in science
1610s in science